Salehabad-e Chaqorli (also Romanized as Şaleḩābād-e Chaqorlī; also known as Şaleḩābād, Qānjīq, and Qanjīq) is a village in Aq Su Rural District, in the Central District of Kalaleh County, Golestan Province, Iran. At the 2006 census, its population was 1,578, in 362 families.

References 

Populated places in Kalaleh County